Konradshöhe is a German locality within the borough of Reinickendorf, Berlin.

History
In the course of the northern extension of Berlin during the 19th century, many people settled in the suburbs, attracted by the proximity to nature and the low price of land. One of them was the coppersmith August Friedrich Theodor Rohmann. In 1865 he acquired a property by the Havel originally intending to establish a copper mine. The settlement was officially established in 1868 and named "Conrads Höh",  after the oldest son of Rohmann.

Part of the municipality of Heiligensee, Konradshöhe merged into Berlin in 1920 with the "Greater Berlin Act". During the Cold War it was part of West Berlin with a short border to East Germany defined by the Havel. In that place the Berlin Wall was built beyond this river.

Geography

Overview
Located in the north-west of Berlin, Konradshöhe is separated from the locality of Hakenfelde (in Bezirk Spandau) by the river Havel, from Tegel and Heiligensee by the eponymous forest. The river also separates Konradshöhe from the Brandenburger municipality of Hennigsdorf (in Oberhavel district).

Subdivision
Konradshöhe is divided into 2 zones (Ortslagen):
Jörsfelde
Tegelort
Jörsfelde, the biggest one, is situated in the north with its center located in the square Falkenplatz.; Tegelort is the southern side located in a peninsula formed by the Havel river and Lake Tegel.

Transport
The locality is not served by railways, but by the bus lines 222 and 324 and also by a couple of private ferry lines to Hakenfelde.

Personalities
Jörg Draeger (b. 1944), anchorman
Kim Fisher (b. 1969), singer and anchorman

Photogallery

References

Literature
 Jörg Müller: "Geschichte und Gegenwart: Die Ortsteile Konradshöhe – Tegelort – Joersfelde", Jahrbuch des Landesarchivs Berlin, 1990

External links

 Konradshöhe page of Reinickendorfer site

Localities of Berlin